Chollerton railway station served the village of Chollerton, Northumberland, England from 1859 to 1958 on the Border Counties Railway.

History 
The station was opened on 1 December 1859 by the North British Railway. It was on the west side of the A6079 at the junction with an unclassified road and immediately southwest of Chollerton village. A goods loop and a coal depot were to the south. A small goods shed was sited at the south end of the platform. Instead of extending the platform, the NBR built a new one to the north with a wooden waiting shelter. The original buildings remained in use and the siding was adjusted so that one of the two docks used the old platform. There was a three-ton crane in the goods yard. The station closed to passengers on 15 October 1956 and closed completely on 1 September 1958.

References

External links 

Disused railway stations in Northumberland
Former North British Railway stations
Railway stations in Great Britain opened in 1859
Railway stations in Great Britain closed in 1956
1859 establishments in England
1958 disestablishments in England